INS Chapal (K94) was a Chamak class missile boat of the Indian Navy.

It is now a museum ship on Rabindranath Tagore Beach in Karwar, Karnataka.

This warship is now positioned on a special concrete platform at Rabindranath Tagore beach in Karwar city, Karnataka state, India.

Mannequins dressed-up as captain, sailors, doctors, etc., are there inside the Museum. Replicas of the missiles are also displayed inside the Warship Museum.

References

External links
INS Chapal Warship Museum and Rock Garden at Karwar Beach

Chamak-class missile boats
Fast attack craft of the Indian Navy
Museum ships in India
Museums in Karnataka
Karwar
Education in Uttara Kannada district
1976 ships